Knoxville Raceway is a semi-banked 1/2 mile dirt oval raceway (zook clay) located at the Marion County Fairgrounds in Knoxville, Iowa, United States.  Races at the "Sprint Car Capital of the World" are held on Saturday nights from April through September each year. Some special events such as the Knoxville Nationals, 360 Knoxville Nationals and Late Model Knoxville Nationals are multi-day events. Weekly racing events at the track features multiple classes of sprint cars including 410 cubic inch, 360 cubic inch and Pro Sprints (previously 305 cubic inch). Each August, the Raceway holds the paramount sprint car event in the United States, the Knoxville Nationals. The track is governed by the 24-member fair board elected by Marion County residents.

History
The first weekly races were held at the Knoxville Raceway in 1954. After internal issues with the sanctioning body—the Southern Iowa Stock Car Racing Association—in 1956, Marion Robinson of Des Moines, Iowa was appointed as race promoter. During Robinson's tenure, the cars progressed from stock cars to modifieds to supermodifieds to sprint cars. Robinson created what would become the Knoxville Nationals in 1961. The event took place over two days and featured a $5,000 purse where today it is now nearly one million dollars.

Timeline
1878 – Race track is built for horse racing.
1901 – First automobile race staged with 2 cars owned by Well's Manufacturing and Tone's Spices Co.
1914 – First race. 
1917 – Old wooden grandstand was built (2,000 capacity).
Until late 1930s: Infield is used for Knoxville high school football games.
1950–1954 – Stock car racing becomes popular after WWII and a few races per year are sanctioned by Newton Stock Car Association. 
1954 – Weekly racing begins. Banking, fencing, and lights are added to the track.
1955 – Weekly racing sanctioned under the Oskaloosa's Southern Iowa Stock Car Racing Association.
1956 – Marion County Fair Board begins sanctioning its own racing and hires Marion Robinson as race promoter.
1959 – Wooden bleachers were added to the west of existing grandstand. (5,000)
1961 – First Knoxville Nationals held, and won by Roy Robbins.
1969 – Wood grandstand was razed.
1970 – New steel and aluminum grandstand. (8,139 seats)
1974 – Promoter Marion Robinson leaves May 1974.
1974 – P. Ray Grimes named promoter, later expands the Nationals to 4 days and creates Nationals scoring point system.
1978 – Remainder of wooden bleachers replaced with steel and aluminum.
1978 – Ralph Capitani named Race Director and Promoter.
1981 – New lighting.
1982 – Wings on sprint cars becomes mandated for safety.
1983 – 360 sprint cars begin competing.
1984 – Grandstands expanded to higher rows in sections A-J.
1987 – First year Nationals were on TNN television.
1987 – Grandstand expansion completed upper tier in sections K-N (11,584).
1990 – Temporary seating added to backstretch for Nationals.
1991 – NSCHoF&M built (400 additional seats).
1991 – Backstretch permanent grandstand added, Sections P-Z (17,224).
1991 – First year of 360 Nationals.
1994 – Backstretch grandstand expanded, sections P-ZZ (19,400).
1995 – Knoxville Nationals broadcast live for first time on TNN.
1996 – Main grandstand upper tier addition, VIP suites, new Musco Lighting. (23,200).
2002 – Concrete added to infield pit area.
2003 – Main grandstand sections AA & BB refitted, added handicap seating (24,192).
2004 – First year of Late Model Knoxville Nationals.
2010 – First points season for 305 sprint cars.
2011 – Ralph Capitani retires at the end of the 2011 season.
2012 – Toby Kruse named GM & Promoter, John McCoy named Race Director.
2013 – Brian Stickel named GM & Promoter.
2014 – New video boards added by Impact Signs.
2015 – McKenna Haase became the first woman to win a feature Sprint Car race at Knoxville Raceway.
2015 – GM Brian Stickel resigns.
2016 – John McCoy given the Promoter and Race Director title.  Gary Schumacher named as Business Manager.  Spire Sports + Entertainment's Kendra Jacobs, named as Marketing Director.
2017 – Additional fencing constructed in turns 1 and 2
2018 – Seats were widened during the off season, eliminating 3,320 seats from the main grandstand and lowering the overall seating capacity to 21,135.
2021 – The track hosted a NASCAR Camping World Truck Series race on July 9 as part of the Corn Belt 150. This will be the first race at the track to ever be sanctioned by NASCAR. On September 29, 2021, NASCAR announced that the Truck Series will return for the 2022 season as the full schedule was released for the series.

Track records
The driver with the most 410 feature wins at the Knoxville Raceway is Danny Lasoski of Dover, Missouri with 112 feature wins.
The driver with the most 360 feature wins is David Hesmer of Marshalltown, Iowa with 65 feature wins.
The driver with the most consecutive wins is Doug Wolfgang of Sioux Falls, SD with 10 wins to start the 1977 season. He won 13 of the 18 events that year including the Knoxville Nationals.

One-lap track records

Sprint car track champions

National Sprint Car Hall of Fame & Museum

The National Sprint Car Hall of Fame & Museum is located just outside Turn 2 of the Knoxville Raceway. It features rotating exhibits to highlight the history of both winged and non-wing sprint cars.

References

External links
Knoxville Raceway

Dirt oval race tracks in the United States
Buildings and structures in Marion County, Iowa
Motorsport venues in Iowa
Tourist attractions in Marion County, Iowa